Il paramedico (The Paramedic) is a 1982 Italian comedy film directed by Sergio Nasca.

Plot  
Mario Miglio, a penniless nurse, accidentally wins a Fiat Argenta. The new machine helps him to conquer Vittoria, the beautiful wife of the banker Pinna, but it also causes him several troubles, as terrorists steal it: for a misunderstanding, Mario himself is mistaken for one of them.

Cast 
 Enrico Montesano: Mario Miglio
 Edwige Fenech: Nina Miglio 
 Daniela Poggi: Vittoria 
 Rossano Brazzi: Augusto Pinna 
 Marco Messeri: Spartaco
 Leo Gullotta: Deputy Prosecutor
 Enzo Robutti: Police Commissioner  
 Mauro Di Francesco: Terrorist 
 Enzo Cannavale: Lawyer Generoso Gallina 
 Enzo Liberti: Doorman 
 Franco Diogene: Palletta 
 Carlo Monni:  Digos Agent

See also       
 List of Italian films of 1982

References

External links

1982 films
1982 comedy films
Films set in Rome
Films shot in Rome
Italian comedy films
Films scored by Armando Trovajoli
1980s Italian-language films
1980s Italian films